The Chaika gas field natural gas field located on the continental shelf of the Black Sea. It was discovered in 2013 and developed by PetroCeltic. It will begin production in 2018 and will produce natural gas and condensates. The total proven reserves of the Chaika gas field are around 80 billion cubic feet (2.3 km³), and production is slated to be around 40 million cubic feet/day (0,56×106m³) in 2018.

References

Black Sea energy
Natural gas fields in Bulgaria